The Command is a 1954 American CinemaScope Western film directed by David Butler. It stars Guy Madison and James Whitmore. It was based on the novel Rear Guard by James Warner Bellah and features a screenplay by Sam Fuller.

Plot
When the commanding officer of a cavalry patrol was wounded and dying, he asks the surviving ranking officer of the patrol who is an army doctor to take over and lead the patrol back to their fort. On the way back to their fort, the cavalry troop passes a town where two companies of infantry troops commanded by a colonel were temporarily taking a breather from their duty of escorting a wagon train of settlers. When the colonel learned of the presence of the cavalry troop, he orders the attachment of the cavalry troop to his command with the specific duty of screening the main body of infantry troops and the wagon train. This attachment resulted in the cavalry troop being involved in several encounters with the native Indians who kept attacking the wagon train. During the trip, the colonel suffers a mild heart attack and is now unable to command. The infantry officers asks the cavalry officer to take over command from the incapacitated infantry colonel. The cavalry doctor-officer took over and lead the combined troops of infantry and cavalry in defeating the Indians.

Cast
 Guy Madison as Capt. Robert MacClaw
 Carl Benton Reid as Col. Janeway
 Joan Weldon as Martha Cutting
 Don Shelton as Maj. Gibbs
 Gregg Barton as Capt. Forsythe
 Robert Nichols as 2nd Lt. O'Hirons
 James Whitmore as 1st Sgt. Elliot
 Boyd 'Red' Morgan as Cpl. Fleming
 Harvey Lembeck as Pvt. Gottschalk

References

External links
 

1954 films
1954 Western (genre) films
American Western (genre) films
Films based on American novels
Films based on Western (genre) novels
Films directed by David Butler
Films scored by Dimitri Tiomkin
Warner Bros. films
Western (genre) cavalry films
CinemaScope films
1950s English-language films
1950s American films